The Pajarito  Mountains (Sierra Pajaritos) are a small mountain range in the Atacama Desert of Chile on the west coast of South America. Together with Paico Peak (Cerro El Paico) they divide the Algarrobal Basin into two hydrological units.

Notes and references

Mountain ranges of Chile